Peta Stephens (born 15 April 1978) is a former Australian netball player. Between 1997 and 2009, Stephens played for Queensland Firebirds. She played for Firebirds in both the Commonwealth Bank Trophy and ANZ Championship eras. She captained Firebirds between 2006 and 2009. She also played with the Australian Institute of Sport, Canterbury Flames and Canterbury Tactix.

Playing career

Early years
Between 1995 and 2000, Stephens represented Queensland in the Australian National Netball Championships at under-19, under-21 and Open levels. 
Between 1997 and 1998, she played for the Australian Institute of Sport. Between 1996 and 1999, she also featured in Australia under-21 squads.

Queensland Firebirds
Between 1997 and 2003, and again from 2005 until 2009, Stephens played for Queensland Firebirds. She played for Firebirds in both the Commonwealth Bank Trophy and ANZ Championship eras. She captained Firebirds between 2006 and 2009. On 1 June 2007, she played her 100th match for Firebirds in a 54–45 win against Hunter Jaegers.

New Zealand
Stephens also had two spells playing netball in New Zealand. In 2004 she played for Canterbury Flames in the National Bank Cup. In 2009, she signed for Canterbury Tactix ahead of the 2010 ANZ Championship season. However a pre-season shoulder injury ruled her out for most of the season.

Notes
  Some sources suggest Stephens played for Melbourne Phoenix c. 2004.

Education
Between 2014 and 2021, Stephens completed a Bachelor of Information Technology with RMIT University.

References

1978 births
Living people
Australian netball players
Netball players from Queensland
Queensland Firebirds players
Commonwealth Bank Trophy players
ANZ Championship players
Australian Institute of Sport netball players
Mainland Tactix players
Australian expatriate netball people in New Zealand
People educated at Brisbane State High School
RMIT University alumni
Sportspeople from Brisbane
Canterbury Flames players